Shazia Hidayat (born 4 April 1976) is a Pakistani former track and field athlete. She was the only female athlete in the Pakistan team competing at the 2000 Olympics in Sydney, Australia. Her personal best for the 1500 metres is 4:58.79 minutes. She participated in athletics in the 2000 Summer Olympics in Sydney, becoming the second woman to ever represent Pakistan in an Olympic event.

Born in Chichawatni, Punjab, she grew up in a village (49/12 L, Subhanpur) 360 kilometers south of Islamabad. She started running at the age of 14.

She had to overcome huge obstacles to compete internationally, the main objection being raised was how a Pakistani woman could race in a competition in which other women do not wear clothes that cover their body. Her parents, especially her father, encouraged her to run, but in the predominantly Muslim country she had to train in, it had to be done at 2:30 in the morning with a brother biking to pace her, because female athletes were not allowed to run on the road. She realized that if she qualified, she would have to wear a jogging suit while others wore shorts. Girls in Pakistan, when allowed to take part in sports, must wear such suits.

She describes running qualifying races in the daytime in her home country where spectators were lining the sidelines not to cheer, but to throw rocks and tomatoes at her. Eventually because of threats to her safety and the lack of security in training and racing facilities, she relocated to Canada. The problems women face in sport in Pakistan is well documented.

In 2011 Hidayat, also competed in the Knights of Columbus Indoor Games in Saskatoon, Canada. She lives in Saskatoon, having moved here from Pakistan.

She currently works at the University of Saskatchewan, takes classes to further improve her English, and trains in the afternoons. She hopes to coach other female runners in the future.

References

Living people
1976 births
Athletes (track and field) at the 2000 Summer Olympics
Olympic athletes of Pakistan
Pakistani female middle-distance runners
Pakistani emigrants to Canada
Naturalized citizens of Canada
Pakistani Roman Catholics
People from Chichawatni
Punjabi people
Punjabi women